Let's Dance 2019 was the fourteenth season of the Swedish celebrity dancing show Let's Dance. The season premiered on 22 March 2019, and is broadcast on TV4. Presenters were Tilde de Paula Eby and David Hellenius.

Contestants

Scoring chart

Red numbers indicate the lowest score of each week.
Green numbers indicate the highest score of each week.
 indicates the couple that was eliminated that week.
 indicates the couple received the lowest score of the week and was eliminated.
 indicates the couple finished in the bottom two.
 indicates the couple earned immunity from elimination.
 indicates the winning couple.
 indicates the runner-up couple.
 indicates the third place couple.

Average chart

References 

2019
TV4 (Sweden) original programming
2019 Swedish television seasons
2019 Swedish television series debuts
2019 Swedish television series endings